This is a list of hills in Belgrade.

 Avala
 Banjičko Brdo (Banjica)
 Banovo Brdo
 Belo Brdo
 Ćurtovo Brdo
 Dedinjsko Brdo (Dedinje)
 Erino Brdo
 Glumčevo Brdo
 Golo Brdo
 Julino Brdo
 Kalemegdansko Brdo (Kalemegdan)
 Kanarevo Brdo
 Labudovo Brdo
 Lekino Brdo
 Lisasto Brdo
 Lozovičko Brdo
 Maleško Brdo
 Milićevo Brdo
 Mitrovo Brdo
 Moračko Brdo
 Nikino Brdo
 Orlovo Brdo
 Pašino Brdo
 Petlovo Brdo
 Stanovačko Brdo
 Starac-Vasino Brdo
 Stojčino Brdo
 Topčidersko Brdo (Topčider)
 Veliko Brdo
 Vodičko Brdo
 Vračarsko Brdo (Vračar)
 Žuto Brdo
 Zvezdarsko Brdo (Zvezdara)

References
  Beograd na 29 brežuljaka

 
Hills In Belgrade
 
Hills
Hills of Serbia